Wachovia Securities was the trade name of Wachovia's retail brokerage and institutional capital markets and investment banking subsidiaries. Following Wachovia's merger with Wells Fargo and Company on December 31, 2008, the retail brokerage became Wells Fargo Advisors on May 1, 2009 and the institutional capital markets and investment banking group became Wells Fargo Securities on July 6, 2009.

Retail brokerage

Wachovia Securities grew through the mergers of multiple companies. Its oldest predecessor company, Leopold Cahn & Co. was founded in 1879.

One of main Wachovia Securities' predecessor companies was founded in 1934 as the investment firm of J.C. Wheat & Co. Wheat fostered growth through mergers, including the 1971 merger with First Securities that created Wheat First Securities, Inc. and the 1988 merger with Butcher & Singer, a successful Philadelphia-based securities firm established in 1910; the firm then became known as Wheat First Butcher Singer. In August 1997, the privately held Wheat First Butcher Singer agreed to be acquired for just under $500 million by the Charlotte, North Carolina-based First Union bank. The brokerage firm changed its name to Wheat First Union, reflecting its newly acquired status. In April 1999, First Union acquired Chicago-based investment bank and brokerage Everen Capital Corp. for $1.1 billion.

Separately, Wachovia Corporation acquired the brokerage firm Interstate Johnson Lane in April 1999, and changed the name to IJL Wachovia.

In 2001, the firm became known as Wachovia Securities when parent companies of Wheat First Union and IJL Wachovia, First Union and Wachovia Corporation, merged. The newly formed Wachovia then merged the brokerage operations to form Wachovia Securities.

Wachovia Securities and the Prudential Securities Division of Prudential Financial combined on July 1, 2003. Wachovia owned 62% of this entity, while Prudential Financial owned 38%. At the time, the new firm had client assets of $532.1 billion, making it the nation's third largest full service retail brokerage firm based on assets. Much of the retail brokerage came from Prudential's previous acquisition of Bache & Co.

In May 2007, Wachovia Securities announced the purchase of A. G. Edwards of St. Louis, Missouri. Following the acquisition, as of October 1, 2007, the Wachovia Securities became the second largest brokerage firm in the United States with $1.17 trillion retail client assets under management.

In 2008 Wachovia was bought out by Wells Fargo for $15.1 billion. This was approximately $7 a share, which is nearly an 80 percent premium closing price of $3.91. On May 1, 2009, the retail brokerage legally changed its name to Wells Fargo Advisors.

Institutional Capital Markets and Investment Banking

Wachovia's institutional capital markets and investment banking business arose from the merger of Wachovia and First Union.  First Union had bought Bowles Hollowell Connor & Co. on April 30, 1998 adding to its merger and acquisition, high yield, leveraged finance, equity underwriting, private placement, loan syndication, risk management, and public finance capabilities.

Legacy components of Wachovia Securities include Bowles Hollowell Connor & Co., Halsey, Stuart & Co., Leopold Cahn & Co., Bache & Co. and Prudential Securities.

References

External links
  (Archive)

Financial services companies established in 2001
Financial services companies disestablished in 2009
Financial services companies of the United States
Companies based in St. Louis